Coulonges may refer to the following places in France:

Coulonges, Charente, a commune in the department of Charente
Coulonges, Charente-Maritime, a commune in the department of Charente-Maritime
Coulonges, Eure, a former commune in the department of Eure
Coulonges, Vienne, a commune in the department of Vienne
Coulonges-Cohan, a commune in the department of Aisne
Coulonges-les-Sablons, a commune in the department of Orne
Coulonges-sur-l'Autize, a commune in the department of Deux-Sèvres
Coulonges-sur-Sarthe, a commune in the department of Orne
Coulonges-Thouarsais, a commune in the department of Deux-Sèvres